Josefina Elisa Villanueva Arias (born 3 February 2000) is a Uruguayan footballer who plays as a goalkeeper for Club Nacional de Football and the Uruguay women's national team. She is also a futsal player who plays for Club Nacional de Football.

International career
Villanueva made her senior debut for Uruguay on 8 October 2019.

References 

2000 births
Living people
Women's association football goalkeepers
Uruguayan women's footballers
Uruguayan women's futsal players
People from Durazno
Uruguay women's international footballers
Colón F.C. players
Liverpool F.C. (Montevideo) players
Club Nacional de Football players
C.A. Progreso players